Carlls Corner is a census-designated place (CDP) in Cumberland County, New Jersey, United States. It is in the northern part of the county, in Upper Deerfield Township. It is bordered at its southwest corner by the city of Bridgeton, the county seat.

New Jersey Routes 77 and 56 intersect at the center of the community, with NJ 56 leading east  to Vineland and NJ 77 leading south  to the center of Bridgeton and north  to Mullica Hill.

Carlls Corner was first listed as a CDP prior to the 2020 census with a population of 911.

Demographics

References 

Census-designated places in Cumberland County, New Jersey
Census-designated places in New Jersey
Upper Deerfield Township, New Jersey